Kyle Dalton Sandilands (born 10 June 1971) is an Australian radio host and television personality. He is currently the co-host, with Jackie O, of the weekday morning radio program The Kyle and Jackie O Show on Sydney's radio station KIIS 106.5.

From 2005 to 2009, and again in 2023, Sandilands served as a judge on Australian Idol. In 2008, he became the host of Big Brother, alongside Jackie O. In 2010, he became a judge on Australia's Got Talent and also on Australia's version of The X Factor.

Sandilands has become known for controversial on-air stunts and offensive comments. This has led to companies removing their advertisements, findings of serious breaches of the Industry Codes of Practice and Guidelines, and to his firing from Australian Idol.

Sandilands and co-host Jackie O moved to new station KIIS 106.5 in 2014 with their show, The Kyle and Jackie Ho Show, to the ARN (Australian Radio Network).

In 2014, Sandilands made his first appearance in a motion picture in Fat Pizza vs. Housos. The film was first shown in Australian cinemas on 27 November 2014.

Radio 
Sandilands landed his first radio job in 1992, at the age of 21, at 4TO Townsville where he was employed to drive the station's promotional vehicle. Within weeks he had declared his willingness to do whatever it took to get ahead: to work anywhere, in any time slot. He took gigs in Cairns, and then Darwin, before joining Austereo's Triple M in a Brisbane station by using a false resumé to impress one of the station's executives. In 1999, he moved to Sydney, and commenced at 2Day FM as host of the Hot30 Countdown, replacing "Ugly Phil O'Neil", a former husband of Jacqueline Henderson (Jackie O). Sandilands attributes his radio career taking off to being told by then Group Program Director Jeff Allis to "do whatever you want, just win". Sandilands was paid $255,000 per year while working on the Hot30.

Much media coverage of Sandilands has focused on the negative aspects of his personality and behaviour, notably his widely publicised clashes with and criticism of other media figures, his intemperate on-air outbursts and his alleged "out of control" ego. In September 2006, Sandilands was named the most hated Australian identity in a Zoo Weekly article, although on 14 October 2006, Sandilands and Henderson were named "Best On-Air Team" at the Australian Commercial Radio Awards. Sandilands and Jackie O were again named "Best On-Air Team" at the Australian Commercial Radio Awards in 2007, 2011, and 2015.

In August 2009, The Kyle and Jackie O Show was put into "indefinite recess" by the Austereo network as a result of a controversial on-air stunt on his morning show on 29 July 2009. He returned to his radio show on 18 August 2009 but was suspended on 9 September 2009 due to on-air comments relating to Magda Szubanski. In the same year he was again named the most hated by Zoo Weekly. Sandilands and Henderson were the hosts of the nationally syndicated chart show The Hot Hits, before swapping host roles with Andrew Günsberg in December 2009, who had previously hosted Take40 Australia, but left the show at the end of 2011.

Television

Australian Idol 
In 2005, Sandilands replaced Ian "Dicko" Dickson as one of the judges on Network Ten's Australian Idol. He continued as a judge on Idol until, just before the premiere of its seventh season, he was dropped from the show in August 2009. He was involved in a number of controversies relating to remarks to contestants as his stint as a judge. In October 2005, he referred to the eventual 2005 Idol winner Kate DeAraugo's arms as "tuckshop lady arms". In September 2006, Sandilands told 2006 runner-up contestant Jessica Mauboy to lose her "jelly belly". A year later, Sandilands referred to contestant Bobby Flynn as a "mong" – a derogatory slang term for mongoloid, referring to people suffering from Down syndrome. Sandilands claimed that he meant no disrespect to those with Down syndrome. On 3 August 2009, Network Ten issued a press statement announcing that Sandilands had been sacked from Australian Idol, citing the network's view that the Kyle and Jackie O Show's content was incompatible with the family-oriented image of Idol.

In September 2022, Sandilands was announced as a returning judge for the Seven Network’s revival of the series for 2023.

Big Brother 
In 2002, Sandilands competed in the only Australian series of Celebrity Big Brother. He finished 3rd on day 23.

On 14 July 2008, two weeks before the season finale, Sandilands appeared on the 2007 Australian season of Big Brother. In an attempt to boost poor ratings and to promote the 2007 season of Australian Idol, Sandilands entered the Gold Coast compound and was due to conduct his radio program in house on that Monday morning. However, after a heated verbal exchange with Big Brother, Sandilands reportedly required anti-nausea injections for migraines and began vomiting every 30 minutes. He left the house soon after. In 2008, Sandilands and Henderson became the hosts of the 2008 season of Big Brother replacing Gretel Killeen. The ratings for the launch of the 2008 series were the lowest in the show's history, and Network Ten ultimately confirmed that it would not continue past the current season.

Australia's Got Talent 
In January 2010, it was announced that Sandilands and Brian McFadden would be the new judges on the fourth season of Australia's Got Talent, replacing former judges Tom Burlinson and Red Symons. During one of the show's auditions, Sandilands was involved in another controversy relating to a contestant on the show. He had asked contestant Heather Cook, "Are you male or female?" When Cook tried to make light of the question, Sandilands then made a joke about her weight, saying, "You're a belly full of laughs". Sandilands added he wasn't hired to be "bland and boring", and that he was just being honest.

The X Factor 
In May 2010, it was announced that Sandilands would become one of the new judges as also the fourth judge on the second season of The X Factor Australia, alongside other new judges Ronan Keating, Guy Sebastian and Natalie Imbruglia who replaced John Reid, Mark Holden and Kate Ceberano. On 16 March 2011, Sandilands announced on his breakfast radio show that he would not be returning as a judge in the third series of The X Factor. He was replaced by Mel B.

Meet the Hockers
In 2017, Sandilands narrated the reality television program Meet the Hockers, a show similar to Pawn Stars, which he also produced. The series debuted on 9Go! on 16 May 2017, and attracted very low ratings of just 98,000 viewers, being beaten by numerous other multichannel programs in the same timeslot.

Trial By Kyle
In 2018, Sandilands appeared in a pilot for a possible television series, Trial By Kyle, on Network Ten. The reality show is set in a court room with Sandilands passing judgement across a whole range of real life cases. Helping him analyse the evidence is former The Bachelor Australia contestant and criminal lawyer Anna Heinrich. The pilot proceeded to a series in 2019.

Controversies
In July and August 2005, Sandilands was accused of "cooking the charts" by giving airplay to "Ooh Ahh" (a song by his then-girlfriend, Tamara Jaber). The allegations were made on TV current affairs program Today Tonight. In 2006, Sandilands won a defamation suit, with the court ruling that Today Tonight had defamed the radio host.

On 2 July 2007, Sandilands and Jackie O were involved in an on-air clash with Australian music personality Molly Meldrum, who described Sandilands as "arrogant", "fat" and "talentless".

On 20 August 2007, Media Watch examined Sandilands' on-air comments asserting that smoking was not as harmful to people as many institutions would lead people to believe and that the statistics presented by these institutions are falsified. These comments led to the Cancer Institute of New South Wales pulling their "13-QUIT" advertisements off the network.

Enough Rope interview 
On 22 August 2007 Sandilands was interviewed by Andrew Denton for Enough Rope. During the interview Sandilands said he wanted to "punch Dave Hughes in the throat" next time he saw him. This was in response to Hughes' reference to Sandilands as a "dickhead" on another program. A subsequent article in The Sydney Morning Herald cited unspecified reports which claimed that Sandilands was left in a "hostile state" by Denton's questions about Sandilands' need to take personal responsibility for the results of his actions on air.

Lie detector incident and sacking from Network Ten
On 29 July 2009, a radio segment involved a distressed teenager who was asked to discuss her sexual history live on air, and in front of her mother. After initially sounding very uncomfortable with the questioning, the girl began crying and said she had been raped when she was 12, and that her mother was already aware of this. Sandilands replied: "Right... is that the only experience you've had?" The stunt was cut short and co-host Jackie O was quick to apologise; however, several of the show's prominent advertisers quickly withdrew sponsorships. In the following days, media commentators, psychologists and rape crisis workers condemned the stunt while expressing deep concern for the well-being of the teenager.

On 3 August 2009, Network Ten issued a press statement announcing that Sandilands had been sacked from Australian Idol, citing the network's view that the Kyle and Jackie O Shows content was incompatible with the family-oriented image of Idol. Guest judges replaced him for the rest of the season. It was also announced that the Kyle and Jackie O Show on 2Day FM and The Kyle and Jackie O Hour of Power would be in recess until a review was completed. A Network Ten spokesman said of Sandilands' firing: "Idol has remained a family-focused show, even more so this year with the 6.30 pm Sunday timeslot. His radio persona has taken on a more controversial position... which is not in the interest of the show."

Responding to his firing, Sandilands said in a statement, "I'm disappointed at Channel 10's decision to remove me from Australian Idol. I have truly loved being a part of the show." Network Ten had held crisis talks with advertisers in the days prior to his firing amid concerns Sandilands would damage their brands. Idol creator Simon Fuller reportedly gave Ten his blessing to fire Sandilands. It was believed Sandilands earned A$1 million of his estimated annual A$2.8 million income from Idol. The suspension of the radio show was announced on Sunday 2 August 2009. The show's usual 6:00 am to 9:00 am slot on 3 August was filled by Chris Page who announced that "They have not been suspended ... the show has not finished." Page then reread Austereo general manager Jenny Parkes' statement on air just after 6:30 am:
Kyle Sandilands's management has advised Austereo that he is unable to perform his duties on-air at this time. Further, following a great deal of consideration and having consulted Jackie O and all stakeholders, Austereo has formed the view that it is in the interest of all parties for the [program] to go into recess until we have completed an across-the-networks review of the principals [sic] and protocols of our interaction with our audience.

Disability comments

Sandilands' comments about disability have outraged Australian disability groups. He called a child with disability a "spider baby" in 2012, and he used terms like "spastics" and "retards". He said he would donate $35,000 to a family of a child with a disability in 2009; however, he donated only $20,000, but he later gave the full amount. In 2006, Sandliands referred to an Australian Idol contestant as a "mong", a term that has been used in the past as a label for people with Down syndrome.

Virgin Mary comments

On 19 September 2019, Sandilands commented on air that the Mother of Jesus was a "liar who got knocked up behind a camel shed" (a skeptical reference to the virgin birth of Jesus), among other related comments. Sandilands later apologised for the remarks; but this did not pacify protesters, who on 23 September called for Sandilands to be sacked, likening the situation to the sacking of Israel Folau earlier that year. The Kyle and Jackie O Show returned to air on 30 September 2019 following a week off air.

Monkeypox Comments 
In 2022 Sandilands claimed that monkeypox was a 'big gay disease' and that “only the gays” are contracting monkeypox. He later claimed that “no one else is giving the gays the warning.”

Personal life 
On various occasions, including in the Enough Rope interview, Sandilands has spoken to the media of his difficult childhood. Growing up in Wynnum, Brisbane, he was deeply affected by his parents' divorce, which happened when he was 10. At 15 his mother and stepfather threw him out of their house after he held a party and damaged their car while they were absent. He never went back, alternating between friends' houses and living on the streets. At 17 his father sent him to live in Townsville with his aunt, Jill Stevens. Interviewed in 2005, Stevens recalled for The Sydney Morning Herald that the young Sandilands:used to listen to that Tammy Wynette song D-I-V-O-R-C-E and just cry and cry. He's never gotten over his parents' divorce... When he was living on the streets, he used to sit outside his father's house at night and watch the lights go out.On 26 September 2008, Sandilands married pop singer Tamara Jaber and the couple shared a house in St Ives, located in Sydney's Upper North Shore. However, on 12 July 2010 it was reported the couple had split.

Since March 2012, it was reported that Sandilands was in a relationship with model Imogen Anthony. They split up in 2019.

On 13 August 2015, Sandilands took his shirt off during a live broadcast of The Morning Show, after claiming he has been "fat-shamed" by the media, and afterwards admitted "I think I'm going to have to do something about the weight. I've got the high blood pressure, the sleep apnoea, I'm a mess." He also confirmed he was to have a hernia operation in December 2015.

In February 2022, Sandilands and his partner Tegan announced they were expecting a baby, and had the gender reveal for Otto during a lavish cruise on Sydney Harbour as two planes streaked coloured smoke overhead. Before their son's birth, Sandilands' announced that they were naming his radio partner Jackie O (radio host) as Otto's godmother, surprising her in their studio off-air. On 11 August 2022 Kyle Sandilands became a father for the first time, when his fiance Tegan Kynaston gave birth to their son Otto.

References

External links 
 
 The Kyle and Jackie O Show
 The Hot Hits With Kyle and Jackie O
 Article reporting June 2005 radio survey

1971 births
Australian television personalities
Big Brother (Australian TV series)
People from Brisbane
Australia's Got Talent
Shock jocks
Australian radio presenters
People from the Eastern Suburbs (Sydney)
Living people
Australian game show hosts
Radio controversies
Religious controversies in radio
Obscenity controversies in radio